Marine Observation Satellite-1 (MOS-1), also known as Momo-1, was Japan's first Earth observation satellite.  It was launched on 19 February 1987 on a N-II rocket from Tanegashima Space Center and was operated by the National Space Development Agency of Japan (NASDA). It is in a polar orbit at roughly 900 km altitude, but was decommissioned on 29 November 1995.

Instruments 
It has four instruments: 
 "Multi-Spectral Electronic Self-Scanning Radiometer (MESSR)" which offers 50 m resolution in two visible and two infra-red spectral bands over two 100 km swathes.
 "Visible and Thermal Infrared Radiometer (VTIR)" which has a much lower resolution in one visible and three infrared bands over a 1,500 km swathe.
 "Micro Scanning Radiometer (MSR)" which measures microwave emission in the 23 GHz and 31 GHz bands.
 "Data Collection System (DCS)" which is an experimental transponder.

References

External links 

 MOS-1 site by JAXA

Earth observation satellites of Japan
Spacecraft launched in 1987
Derelict satellites orbiting Earth